{{Album ratings
|rev1 = The Sydney Morning Herald
|rev1score = (favourable)<ref>Elder, Bruce (2009-04-11). [http://www.smh.com.au/news/cd-reviews/gurrumul/2008/04/11/1207856814878.html Gurrumul - CD review]. The Sydney Morning Herald.</ref>
|rev2 = Allmusic
|rev2score = 
}}Gurrumul is the debut solo album for Geoffrey Gurrumul Yunupingu. It is performed in a mixture of both Yolngu and English. It reached number three on the ARIA charts, won ARIA awards for Best World Music Album and Best Independent Release and won a Deadly for Album of the Year. The track "Gurrumul History (I Was Born Blind)" also won a Deadly for Single of the Year.

The album reached 3× Platinum sales in excess of 210,000. In October 2010, it was listed in the top 30 in the book, 100 Best Australian Albums. On November 23, 2012, the album was certified Silver in the United Kingdom for sales of 60,000 copies. It is the best-selling Aboriginal and Torres Strait Islander music album in Australian history, launching Yunupingu's international solo career and establishing him as one of Australia's most significant musical artists.

In 2018, the album was inducted into the National Film and Sound Archive's Sounds of Australia collection of historic recordings, the first recording selected in its first year of eligibility. In December 2021, the album was listed at no. 20 in Rolling Stone Australia’s'' ‘200 Greatest Albums of All Time’ countdown.

Track listing
All tracks written by Geoffrey Gurrumul Yunupingu.

Charts

Weekly charts

Year-end  charts

Certifications

References

2008 debut albums
ARIA Award-winning albums
Geoffrey Gurrumul Yunupingu albums